Tunisian coup d'état may refer to:

1987 Tunisian coup d'état
2021 Tunisian self-coup